Secrets of Astrology, released in 2000, is the fifth album, but the fourth studio recorded album, by symphonic rock vocalist, Lana Lane. Though this album is Lane's fifth album release in the US, it is her eighth in Japan. The album was recorded in the Netherlands and in Los Angeles and mixed in the Netherlands by Oscar Holleman. Mastering was executed at Abbey Road Studios in London.

The album contains 13 songs, whereas the 13th track is listed as a bonus track. In the North American and Japanese releases of Secrets of Astrology, the bonus track is a song entitled, "Romeo and Juliet", a song Lane had recorded during the recording sessions for this album. In the European release of Secrets of Astrology, the bonus track is a song entitled, "Rhapsody", a song that Lane had recorded during the recording sessions for her 1998 album, Queen of the Ocean.

Track listing

Personnel
Lana Lane - vocals
Erik Norlander - keyboards, mellotron, organ, piano, producer, engineer, mixing, mastering
Tony Franklin - bass, acoustic guitar, percussion, backing vocals
Arjen Anthony Lucassen - guitars, acoustic guitar, bass, mellotron on track 8
David Victor - guitars
Mark McCrite - acoustic guitar, mellotron on track 1
Robert Soeterboek - harmony vocals
Ed Warby - drums
Istvan Szeker - violin
Novi Novog - viola
Cameron Stone - cello
Oscar Holleman - engineer, mixing
Stephen van Haestregt - engineer

References

2000 albums
Lana Lane albums
Limb Music albums